Caloptilia ingrata is a moth of the family Gracillariidae. It is known from Tanzania.

References

Endemic fauna of Tanzania
ingrata
Insects of Tanzania
Moths of Africa
Moths described in 1989